Sindihui Mixtec is a nearly extinct Mixtec language spoken in the town of Santa Maria Sindihui in Oaxaca. It is not close to other varieties of Mixtec. It is only spoken by older adults.

References 

Mixtec language
Languages of Mexico
Oto-Manguean languages